The Keweenaw Mountain Lodge and Golf Course Complex is a resort located near Copper Harbor, Michigan. It was designated a Michigan State Historic Site in 1976 listed on the National Register of Historic Places in 1970, and open to the public.

Description 

A golf course, constructed at the same time as the lodge and cabins, covers much of the remaining land. Mountain bike trails and a disc golf course have been added in recent years. All structures within the district are unified by their rustic construction; the structures have low gable roofs and are made using rough-cut stone and dark painted logs.

History 
During the early 1930s, the Great Depression hit Keweenaw County hard. The mining industry had fallen on hard times, and unemployment stood at over seventy percent. Ocha Potter, the head of the Keweenaw County Road Commission and superintendent of Ahmeek Mine, conceived of constructing a resort complex in the county. In 1933, he applied to the federal government for funding under the newly created Civil Works Administration.

Clearing of the forest cover began in the winter of 1933/34, and the stumps were cleared as the weather let up. The logs from the property were used construct the lodge. By the end of 1934, the lodge was nearly completed and the first nine holes of the golf course were cleared and seeded. (A second planned nine holes was never completed.) In 1935, another project to build 20 cabins was approved by the Works Progress Administration, which were completed during the next few years. Four additional cottages were built in 1947/48 using profits from the operation of the lodge.

In July 2018, Keweenaw County will auction off the lodge.

Significance 
The lodge complex was designed and built in 1934 and 1935, in the depths of the Great Depression, using crews of local workmen. The construction was overseen by Keweenaw County and used federal relief money. The site is an example of government-funded work projects designed to boost local economies, and is significant in its effort to protect and maintain the environment while offering recreational opportunity.

References

Further reading

External links

Buildings and structures in Keweenaw County, Michigan
Hotel buildings on the National Register of Historic Places in Michigan
Shingle Style architecture in Michigan
Buildings and structures completed in 1935
Rustic architecture in Michigan
Historic districts on the National Register of Historic Places in Michigan
Works Progress Administration in Michigan
Michigan State Historic Sites in Keweenaw County
Tourist attractions in Keweenaw County, Michigan
Resorts in Michigan
National Register of Historic Places in Keweenaw County, Michigan